Adams Township is one of fourteen townships in Madison County, Indiana, United States. As of the 2010 census, its population was 3,892 and it contained 1,614 housing units.

It was named for Abraham Adams, a pioneer settler.

Geography

Cities, towns, villages
 Anderson (southeast edge)
 Markleville

Unincorporated towns
 Alliance at 
 Emporia at 
 New Columbus at

Cemeteries
The township contains these five cemeteries: Capp, Collier, Gilmore, Peewee and Walker.

Major highways
  U.S. Route 36
  Indiana State Road 38
State Road 109

None

Education
 South Madison Community School Corporation

Adams Township residents may obtain a free library card from the Pendleton Community Public Library in Pendleton.

Political districts
 Indiana's 6th congressional district
 State House District 37
 State Senate District 25

References
 
 United States Census Bureau 2008 TIGER/Line Shapefiles
 IndianaMap

External links
 Indiana Township Association
 United Township Association of Indiana
 City-Data.com page for Adams Township
 Adams Township History Page

Townships in Madison County, Indiana
Townships in Indiana